Elswick may refer to:

Elswick, Lancashire, England
Elswick, Newcastle upon Tyne, Tyne and Wear, England
Elswick, Saskatchewan, a ghost town in Canada
Elswick (automobile), an English automobile
Elswick Ordnance Company, part of Armstrong Whitworth